Mankhurd Shivaji Nagar Assembly constituency is one of the 288 Vidhan Sabha (Legislative Assembly) constituencies of Maharashtra state in western India.

Overview
Mankhurd Shivaji Nagar constituency is one of the 26 Vidhan Sabha constituencies located in the Mumbai Suburban district.

Mankhurd Shivaji Nagar is a part of the Mumbai North East Lok Sabha constituency along with five other Vidhan Sabha segments, namely Vikhroli, Ghatkopar West, Ghatkopar East, Mulund  and Bhandup West in the Mumbai Suburban district.

Samajwadi Party MLA Shri Abu Asim Azmi had secured three consecutive wins in the Mankhurd Shivaji Nagar constituency facing tough competition with opposition parties like Shiv Sena, Vanchit Bahujan Aghadi, Indian National Congress and independent candidates like Mohammad Siraj Mohammad Iqbal.

Members of Legislative Assembly

Election results

Assembly Elections 2019

Assembly Elections 2014

Assembly Elections 2009

Environment
Mankhurd Shivaji Nagar has India's oldest and largest  landfill Deonar Dumping Ground. It is used to dump the majority of solid waste of Mumbai which is causing various health issues in the region. Current MLA Abu Azmi Azmi is fighting with the Maharashtra Government over stopping the dumping of Solid waste at Deonar Dumping Ground.

See also
 Mankhurd
 Deonar Dumping Ground
List of constituencies of Maharashtra Vidhan Sabha

References

Assembly constituencies of Mumbai
Politics of Mumbai Suburban district
Assembly constituencies of Maharashtra
Monuments and memorials to Shivaji